Sanjana Anand (born 28 March 1995) is an Indian actress who appears in Kannada films.

Career
She made her debut with Chemistry of Kariyappa which was released in February 2019. Her second film Male Billu was released in July 2019. She appeared as the female lead in Kushka which was released in February 2021 after being postponed due to the COVID-19 pandemic. She made her web series debut with Honeymoon, which was directed by Vikram Yoganand.

She appeared as the female lead in Duniya Vijay's directorial debut Salaga, in Shokiwala opposite Ajay Rao, and in Kshatriya opposite Chiranjeevi Sarja. She was also reported to be one of the two lead actresses who will star opposite Nirup Bhandari in the romantic thriller tentatively named Window Seat.

She was cast in Addhuri Lover but walked out of the project in July 2021, due to scheduling conflicts.

Filmography

Films

Web series

References

External links
 

Indian film actresses
Living people
1995 births